Estakhr Sar may refer to:
 Estakhr Sar, Gilan
 Estakhr Sar, Sari, Mazandaran Province
 Estakhr Sar, Savadkuh, Mazandaran Province
 Estakhr Sar, Tonekabon, Mazandaran Province